The Belchenflue is a mountain of the Jura, located on the border between the Swiss cantons of Basel-Landschaft and Solothurn, south of Eptingen. The nearby Belchenflue Pass links the two cantons.

The mountain is also known as the Swiss Belchen (Schweizer Belchen) and is part of the so-called Belchen System, a group of mountains with the name "Belchen" that may have been part of a Celtic sun calendar.

See also
Belchen Tunnel

References

External links

Belchenflue on Hikr

Mountains of Switzerland
Mountains of Basel-Landschaft
Mountains of the Jura
Mountains of the canton of Solothurn
One-thousanders of Switzerland
Basel-Landschaft–Solothurn border